Vecima Networks is a Canadian company that develops hardware and software solutions for broadband access, content delivery, and telematics.  It was founded in Saskatoon, Saskatchewan, and currently has offices in Saskatoon, Burnaby, Atlanta, London, Amsterdam, Tokyo, and is headquartered in Victoria. Vecima sells its products to original equipment manufacturers (OEMs), system integrators, MSOs and other service providers.

History
Sumit Kumar is the CEO and president. Surinder Kumar is the founder of the company and is the chairman of the board.

 1988 - Wavecom Electronics is founded and incorporated by Surinder Kumar.
 1990 - First commercial products include a line of modulators for the cable television industry.
 1998 - Corporate Headquarters relocated to Victoria.
 2003 - Wavecom changes name to VCom.
 2003 - VCom acquires YourLink, a wireless service provider.
 2005 - VCom transitions to a public company – VCM on the TSX.
 2005 - VCom wins the Advancing Technology award at BC Export Awards.
 2006 - VCom changes its name to Vecima Networks.
 2007 - Vecima acquires Spectrum Signal Processing (Burnaby), a signal processing hardware company.
 2008 - Vecima signs supply agreement with Cisco Systems.
 2013 - Vecima announces appointment of Sumit Kumar to position of CEO.
 2016 - Vecima acquires Contigo Systems, a telematics company.
 2017 - Vecima sells YourLink to Xplornet.
 2017 - Vecima acquires Concurrent Computer Corporation, a video content delivery and storage company.

References

External links
 Vecima Networks
 Nero Global Tracking

Companies listed on the Toronto Stock Exchange
Electronics companies of Canada
Telecommunications equipment vendors
Canadian companies established in 1988
Telecommunications companies established in 1988
1988 establishments in British Columbia